Leonard Harold Reilly (31 January 1917 — 26 June 1998) was an English footballer who played as a centre half.

Career
In February 1936, Reilly signed Norwich City from Diss Town. Reilly made 30 Football League appearances for the club over the course of ten years, before signing for Chelmsford City. During his time at Norwich, Reilly made one guest appearance for Swindon Town. In 1947, Reilly signed for Gorleston, becoming the club's first official manager in the process.

References

1917 births
1998 deaths
Association football defenders
English footballers
English football managers
People from Rotherhithe
Diss Town F.C. players
Norwich City F.C. players
Swindon Town F.C. wartime guest players
Chelmsford City F.C. players
Gorleston F.C. players
Gorleston F.C. managers
English Football League players